This article shows all participating team squads at the 2016 FIVB Volleyball Men's Club World Championship, held from 18 to 23 October 2016 in Betim, Brazil.

Pool A

Sada Cruzeiro
The following is the roster of the Brazilian club Sada Cruzeiro in the 2016 FIVB Volleyball Men's Club World Championship.

Head coach:  Marcelo Mendez

Taichung Bank
The following is the roster of the Taiwanese club Taichung Bank in the 2016 FIVB Volleyball Men's Club World Championship.

Head coach:  Ke-Chou Cheng

Tala'ea El-Gaish
The following is the roster of the Egyptian club Tala'ea El-Gaish in the 2016 FIVB Volleyball Men's Club World Championship.

Head coach:  Sherif H. El Shemerly

Zenit Kazan
The following is the roster of the Russian club Zenit Kazan in the 2016 FIVB Volleyball Men's Club World Championship.

Head coach:  Vladimir Alekno

Pool B

Personal Bolívar
The following is the roster of the Argentinian club Personal Bolívar in the 2016 FIVB Volleyball Men's Club World Championship.

Head coach:  Javier Weber

UPCN San Juan
The following is the roster of the Argentinian club UPCN San Juan in the 2016 FIVB Volleyball Men's Club World Championship.

Head coach:  Fabian Armoa

Trentino Diatec
The following is the roster of the Italian club Trentino Diatec in the 2016 FIVB Volleyball Men's Club World Championship.

Head coach:  Angelo Lorenzetti

Minas Tênis Clube
The following is the roster of the Brazilian club Minas Tênis Clube in the 2016 FIVB Volleyball Men's Club World Championship.

Head coach:  Nery Tambeiro

References

External links
Official website

C
2016 in volleyball